Kedia is a village in Central District of Botswana. It is located 15 km south-west of a larger village, Mopipi, and it has a primary school. The population was 793 in 2001 census.

References

Populated places in Central District (Botswana)
Villages in Botswana